The France national long track team is the national long track motorcycle racing team of France and is controlled by the French Motorcycle Federation. The team started in all editions of Team Long Track World Championship and won a bronze medal twice (2007, 2009).

Competition

Riders 
Riders who have started in Team Long Track World Championship Finals:

See also 
 France national speedway team

External links 
 (fr) FFA webside

National long track teams
Long track
Team